Samurai Shodown VI, known as  in Japan, is the tenth iteration in the Samurai Shodown series.

On December 17, 2014, the game was released as a PS2 Classic for the PlayStation 3 through the PlayStation Network, although only on the Japanese Store. On November 22, 2016, the game was released for the PlayStation 4 on North America through the PlayStation Network, with enhanced features such as trophy support and uprendered resolution.

Gameplay 
The game features new backgrounds with 2D and 3D elements, as well as a returning cast of all 28 characters from Samurai Shodown V Special, 2 sub-bosses from Samurai Shodown V, as well as all 7 characters from Samurai Shodown and Samurai Shodown II that didn't appear in later games, and 4 new characters. It also features a "spirit select" system, which allows players to choose between six different fighting styles based on all previous installments.

Characters

Release
Despite normal Samurai Shodown releases and distribution outside Japan, the game has been released outside of the country on the Atomiswave system, published in the United States by Sega. The game was released for the PlayStation 2 in Japan on January 25, 2006. The American and European home versions were released respectively on March 24 and March 29, 2009, on the PS2, PSP and Wii as part of the compilation Samurai Shodown Anthology. The PS2 release added even more playable characters, and three more spirit select systems to go along with them.  With the PS2 release, virtually every character to have ever appeared in the Neo Geo games including the referee, Kuroko, and the animal characters, are all playable. The Samurai Shodown Anthology version is similar to the PS2 version except that everything is unlocked at the start. In 2020, a homebrew conversion was released for the Dreamcast.

Reception

References

External links
 
Samurai Shodown VI at the official website of Sega 
Iroha game listed in SNK-Playmore DS schedule

2005 video games
2D fighting games
Arcade video games
Examu games
Fighting games used at the Super Battle Opera tournament
Multiplayer and single-player video games
PlayStation 2 games
PlayStation Network games
Samurai Shodown video games
SNK Playmore games
Video games about samurai
Video games developed in Japan
Video games set in China
Video games set in Ireland
Video games set in Japan
Video games set in Peru
Video games set in Tanzania
Video games set in the Caribbean
Video games set in the United States
Wii games